The Anchorage is a historic home and farm complex located near Charlottesville, Albemarle County, Virginia.  The original section of the house, built about 1825, consists of a two-story, brick hall and parlor plan dwelling with a raised basement and a slate roof. About 1850, a north facing brick wing was added and the house was remodeled to reflect the then popular Italianate and Gothic Revival styles. An existing porch was later made two-story, and, in the early 1900s, a small wood framed kitchen wing was added. Also on the property are a contributing barn and family cemetery.

It was added to the National Register of Historic Places in 2001.

References

Houses on the National Register of Historic Places in Virginia
Gothic Revival architecture in Virginia
Italianate architecture in Virginia
Houses completed in 1825
Houses in Albemarle County, Virginia
National Register of Historic Places in Albemarle County, Virginia